Brian P. Belway (born May 28, 1963 in Ottawa, Ontario) is a former National Football League defensive end.

Belway played one game for the Los Angeles Raiders in the 1987 season. He chose to cross the picket lines and play as a non union player during the NFL players strike while most of the union players (legitimate NFLers) chose not to play at that time.

Belway was drafted in the first round, seventh overall, by the Winnipeg Blue Bombers in 1986.  Released by the Bombers, he was 
signed by the Calgary Stampeders in July 1986. Calgary released Belway in June 1987. After his stint with the Raiders, Belway was signed the 
Saskatchewan Roughriders in February 1988. Released, his signed with the BC Lions in July. He was signed by the Edmonton Eskimos

References

1963 births
Living people
Canadian football defensive linemen
American football defensive ends
Calgary Stampeders players
Canadian expatriate American football people in the United States
Canadian players of American football
Calgary Dinos football players
Edmonton Elks players
Gridiron football people from Ontario 
Los Angeles Raiders players
Canadian football people from Ottawa
Players of Canadian football from Ontario
Saskatchewan Roughriders players
National Football League replacement players